The European Strategic Intelligence and Security Center (ESISC) is a self-described think tank and lobbying group dealing with issues related to terrorism and security. ESISC notes on its website that its "lobbying operations can defend an industrial portfolio, the economic opening of a new market, or the political interests of a state."

It is operated by Claude Moniquet, a French right-wing journalist, who is known for his connections with Azerbaijani caviar diplomacy and receiving financial means to promote Azerbaijani interests.

History, and overview 
ESISC was founded in April 2002 by Claude Moniquet. In 2019, the ESISC website listed staff members from Russia, Morocco, Italy, and Belgium.

In August 2007, the Belgian Ministry of the Interior renounced the advisory services of ESISC accusing Claude Moniquet of embezzlement and illegal possession of arms.

In 2018, Claude Moniquet announced that ESISC had entered into a collaboration with the Washington Strategic Intelligence Center (WSIC), "a new American think-tank." According to its founders, all of whom are Moroccan, WSIC "follows the road traced by our King, His Majesty Mohammed VI, may God glorify his rule."

Moniquet and his colleagues at ESISC promote controversial theories claiming that George Soros controls an international conspiracy through which "he wants to destabilize sovereign states in order to impose his agenda and defend his financial interests." In a 2017 report, ESISC warns that "Soros-financed 'destabilisation operations'" are targeting numerous states, including Russia, Hungary, Turkey, Ukraine, Azerbaijan, Macedonia, and Serbia.

Election observers 
Representatives of ESISC participated in 2013 Azerbaijani presidential elections and 2015 parliamentary elections as observers. They evaluated the elections positively and criticized the assessments of the OSCE/ODIHR mission, in which the elections were recognized as inappropriate to democratic norms.

According to the “Freedom Files Analytical Center”, ESISC lobbies for Azerbaijan's interests and provides services of “false observers,” whose task is to participate in the elections of autocratic states as observers, inform on a democratic vote, and criticize the OSCE/ ODIHR observation mission.

According to Robert Coalson (Radio Free Europe/Radio Liberty), ESISC is a part of Baku's lobbying efforts to use analytical centers to change public opinion about Azerbaijan.

Report on Western Sahara  
In 2005 and again in 2008 and 2010  ESISC issued reports on Western Sahara that dovetailed closely with official Moroccan views and claimed that there existed a link between Al Qaeda and the nationalist group Polisario, which seeks Western Sahara's independence from Morocco. Western Sahara expert Jacob Mundy described ESISC's publications as "think tank reports paid for by the [Moroccan] royal palace" to discredit Polisario. 

Le Journal Hebdomadaire, a leading Moroccan independent weekly, published an article critical of the first ESISC report and noted that it reflected the official views of the Moroccan government. Moniquet then sued the newspaper in a Moroccan court, which ordered Le Journal Hebdomadaire to pay him 360,000 dollars. Unable to pay the fine, Le Journal Hebdomadaire was closed, in what Mundy termed the conclusion of a "successful five-year campaign to drive one of [Morocco's] few independent media voices out of existence". According to Moroccan journalists, this was the largest-ever fine against the media in Morocco, and the Committee to Protect Journalists noted major irregularities in the trial. Another press freedom organization, Reporters Without Borders (RSF), described the trial as “politically motivated and unfair.” Human Rights Watch also voiced concern over the trial, while Freedom House termed the lawsuit "a politically motivated effort to bankrupt the magazine."

Social anthropologist of the Sahara Desert, Konstantina Isidoros, said that in both 2005 and 2008, ESISC issued two near-identical reports proclaiming distorted truths that Polisario is evolving to new fears terrorism, radical Islamism or international crime. According Isidoros "lies appear to play some peculiar importance in this report"

The report “Republic of Azerbaijan: a model of good governance” 
A month before the 2013 Azerbaijani presidential elections, ESISC issued a report entitled “The Republic of Azerbaijan: a model of good governance”. According to Robert Coalson, a correspondent of Radio Free Europe, the "haphazardly edited" and "ungrammatical" report praised the stable social welfare" and the situation for women and religious minorities in Azerbaijan. Noting that the ESISC website advertises "customized reports, analysis, and [...] briefings responding exactly to the needs of each client in his or her sector of activity," Coalson accused ESISC of operating as a "front" for Azerbaijan."

Syria, Rifaat al-Assad, and Russia 
ESISC has also worked on behalf of members of the al-Assad family, producing a laudatory report in 2010 that portrayed Ribal al-Assad (a cousin of Syrian President Bashar al-Assad) as a leader of the Syrian opposition and a "democratic alternative" struggling for human rights. Ribal is the son of Rifaat al-Assad, brother of former Syrian President Hafiz al-Assad. According to France 24, Rifaat al-Assad personally oversaw the 1982 Hama massacre, and Human Rights Watch reports that he ordered "the extrajudicial killings of an estimated 1,000 prisoners" during a single day in 1980.

By 2019, ESISC had scrubbed the 2010 report from its website. However, another report by Claude Moniquet from 2011 that similarly highlights Ribal al-Assad remained on the website.

The report “The Armenian Connection” 

On March 6, 2017, ESISC published the report “The Armenian Connection,” which leveled severe accusations against a number of NGOs specializing in human rights protection or researching human rights abuses and corruption in Azerbaijan, Turkey and Russia. ESISC claimed that these organisations aim to create a network of PACE deputies, who will participate in a political war against Azerbaijan. This network included the then member of PACE Christoph Strässer (Germany), Frank Schwabe (Germany), Pieter Omtzigt (Netherlands), René Rouquet (France), François Rochebloine (France) and others. The report stated that Strässer and Schwabe were, within the SPD, the main actors of a campaign promoting the recognition of the 1915 Armenian genocide, and Pieter Omtzigt had close connections with the Armenian lobby in Netherlands. René Rouquet was the President of the French-Armenian friendship socialist parliamentary group; François Rochebloine presided the “France-Karabakh” Circle, and was active in organizing “solidarity” trips to the Nagorno-Karabakh region of Azerbaijan occupied by Armenia. 

A follow-up report published on April 18 claimed that the anti-Azerbaijani network included a number of prime ministers of European countries, Armenian officials, and public organizations: Human Rights Watch, Amnesty International, Human Rights House Foundation, Open Dialog, European Stability Initiative, Helsinki Committee for Human Rights, etc. According to the report, this anti-Azerbaijani network is funded by the Soros Foundation to serve the interests of George Soros and Armenia. ESISC also alleged that the Soros network targets other nations, such as Russia and Hungary.

According to the Freedom Files Analytical Center, the ESISC report is propaganda and seeks to stop criticism of lobbying and corruption. The European Stability Initiative stated that “the ESISC report is full of lies”.

References 

Think tanks
Lobbying organizations